The Grammy Award for Best Choral Performance has been awarded since 1961.  There have been several minor changes to the name of the award over this time:

In 1961 the award was known as Best Classical Performance - Choral (including oratorio)
From 1962 to 1964 it was awarded as Best Classical Performance - Choral (other than opera)
In 1965, 1969, 1971, 1977 to 1978 and 1982 to 1991 it was awarded as Best Choral Performance (other than opera)
From 1966 to 1968 it was awarded as Best Classical Choral Performance (other than opera)
In 1970, 1973 to 1976 and 1979 to 1981 it was awarded as Best Choral Performance, Classical (other than opera)
In 1972 it was awarded as Best Choral Performance - Classical
From 1992 to 1994 it was awarded as Best Performance of a Choral Work
1995 to the present the award has been known as Best Choral Performance

Prior to 1961 the awards for opera and choral performances were combined into a single award for Best Classical Performance, Operatic or Choral.

The award goes to the Conductor, and to the Choral Director and/or Chorus Master where applicable and to the Choral Organization/Ensemble.

Years reflect the year in which the Grammy Awards were presented, for works released in the previous year. Performers who were not eligible for an award (such as orchestras, soloists or choirs) are mentioned between brackets. From 2017, the choral organization/ensemble does receive an Award.

Recipients

Notes

References

Grammy Awards for classical music
Choral Performance